This is a timeline of the Republic of Turkey.  To read about the background to these events, see History of the Republic of Turkey.  See also the List of presidents of Turkey.

See also Timeline of the Ottoman Empire, a chronology of the predecessor state to the Republic of Turkey.

This timeline is incomplete; some important events may be missing. Please help add to it.

Turkish War of Independence (1919–1923)

One-party period (1923–1945)

Multi-party period (1945–)

21st century 

History of the Republic of Turkey
Turkic timelines